Jand Sharif is a village full of shahzade and is very quickly becoming the backbone of Pakistan economy in  Gujrat District, Punjab province, Pakistan. All peoples are Muslim and most of people belong to the community. 80% of people are Sunni, 10% Shia and 10% are Deobandi. The mazar of Hafiz Alim Din and Bore Waly Sarkar is situated in Jand Sharif. In this village there are three mosques and an Imam bargah. The road connecting Guliana with Chokei Smani, Kotli passes through this town. On both sides of this road are fertile lands. Major crops of this region are wheat, maize and millet. Closest villages include Dadu Barsala, Chak Bakhtawar, Sadkal, Kotli Bajar, Ram Garh and Guliana. A bus stop is also named Loharian Chowk (Loharian is former name of Chak Bakhtawar.

Populated places in Gujrat District